Kaveen Bandara (born 22 August 1997) is a Sri Lankan cricketer. He made his first-class debut for Colombo Cricket Club in the 2017–18 Premier League Tournament on 15 December 2017. Prior to his first-class debut, he was named in Sri Lanka's squad for the 2016 Under-19 Cricket World Cup.

He made his List A debut for Colombo Cricket Club in the 2017–18 Premier Limited Overs Tournament on 12 March 2018. He made his Twenty20 debut on 23 May 2022, for Nondescripts Cricket Club in the Major Clubs T20 Tournament.

References

External links
 

1997 births
Living people
Sri Lankan cricketers
Colombo Cricket Club cricketers
Nondescripts Cricket Club cricketers
Place of birth missing (living people)